Richard Enrique Celis Sánchez (born 23 April 1996) is a Venezuelan footballer who plays as a forward for Millonarios of Colombia on loan from Caracas

International career
He made his debut for Venezuela national football team on 8 June 2021 in a World Cup qualifier against Uruguay. He substituted Jefferson Savarino in the 83rd minute. 

He was also selected for Venezuela's 2021 Copa América squad and appeared in their opening 0–3 loss to Brazil.

References

External links
 FK Senica official club profile
 

1996 births
Living people
Venezuelan footballers
Venezuela international footballers
Association football forwards
Atlético Venezuela C.F. players
Deportivo JBL del Zulia players
Venezuelan Primera División players
FK Senica players
Caracas FC players
Slovak Super Liga players
Venezuelan expatriate footballers
Expatriate footballers in Slovakia
Venezuelan expatriate sportspeople in Slovakia
2021 Copa América players